was a town located in Naka District, Ibaraki Prefecture, Japan.

As of 2003, the town had an estimated population of 8,851 and a density of 603.75 persons per km². The total area was 14.66 km².

On January 21, 2005, Urizura, along with the town of Naka (also from Naka District) was merged to create the city of Naka and no longer exists as an independent municipality.

External links
 Official website of Naka (city) 

Dissolved municipalities of Ibaraki Prefecture
Naka, Ibaraki